Rowing competitions at the 2021 Junior Pan American Games in Cali, Colombia were held from 1 to 4 December 2021.

Medal summary

Medal table

Medalists

Men's

Women's

References

External links
Rowing at the 2021 Junior Pan American Games

Rowing
Junior Pan American Games